Flore Vasseur (born 1973) is a French film director, screenwriter, film producer, novelist, journalist and entrepreneur. Her first feature-length documentary film, Bigger Than Us, premiered in the Cinema for the Climate section at the 2021 Cannes Film Festival and was nominated for the 2022 César Award for Best Documentary Film.

Personal life
Vasseur is a former snowboard champion. She graduated in Business and Marketing at HEC Paris, and in Political Studies at the Grenoble Institute of Political Studies.
Vasseur lives in France and has two children.

Filmography

Documentaries
 2017: Meeting Snowden (medium-length film)
 2021: Bigger Than Us

Television
 2009: TED: 18 minutes pour changer le monde (short film): co-director and writer
 2013: Les Insoumises (documentary): writer
 2015–2016: The Last Panthers (mini-series): script consultant

Books
 Une fille dans la ville (2006)
 Comment j’ai liquidé le siècle (2010)
 En bande organisée (2013)
 Ce qu'il reste de nos rêves (2019)

Awards and nominations

References

External links

 
 Flore Vasseur on UniFrance
 Flore Vasseur on AlloCiné
 Flore Vasseur on Cineuropa

1973 births
Living people
People from Annecy
French women film directors
French writers
French women writers
French journalists
French film directors
French documentary film directors
French-language film directors
French women screenwriters
French women film producers
French television writers
Writers from Auvergne-Rhône-Alpes
French women novelists
French fiction writers
Grenoble Alpes University alumni
HEC Paris alumni
21st-century French novelists
21st-century French women writers